James Brandon (1865 – 1942) was a Scottish footballer who played in the Football League for Bootle and Preston North End.

He had several relatives who played the game: brothers Tom (later capped for Scotland) and Bob were teammates in his early career at St Mirren, cousin Harry won the FA Cup with The Wednesday (where all four men played to some extent) in 1896, and nephew Tom played for Hull City among other clubs.

References

1865 births
People from Kilbirnie
Footballers from North Ayrshire
Scottish footballers
St Mirren F.C. players
Preston North End F.C. players
Sheffield Wednesday F.C. players
Chesterfield F.C. players
Bootle F.C. (1879) players
English Football League players
Date of birth missing
1942 deaths
Port Glasgow Athletic F.C. players
Date of death missing
Place of death missing
Association football forwards